Rodopi may refer to:

 Rhodope Mountains, a mountain range in Southeastern Europe
 Rodopi (village), a village in Haskovo Province, southern Bulgaria
 Rodopi Peak, a peak in the South Shetland Islands
 Rhodope (regional unit), an administrative unit of Greece
 Rodopi Municipality, a municipality in Plovdiv Province, Bulgaria
 Rodopi (publisher), an academic publishing company in the Netherlands
 , a Hansa A Type cargo ship in service 1946-74